The ReliaQuest Bowl is an annual college football bowl game played at Raymond James Stadium in Tampa, Florida, usually on New Year's Day. The event has been formerly called the Hall of Fame Bowl from 1986 to 1995 and the Outback Bowl from 1996 to 2022. It is organized by the Tampa Bay Bowl Association under Jim McVay, who has been the president and CEO since 1988.

History

Previous Tampa bowl game
The Cigar Bowl was played at old Phillips Field near downtown Tampa from 1947 to 1954. Because the Cigar Bowl featured teams from smaller colleges, however, the 1986 Hall of Fame Bowl was the first major college bowl game to be played in the area.

Hall of Fame Bowl

The Hall of Fame Classic was a mid-level bowl game played at Legion Field in Birmingham, Alabama from 1977 to 1985. In the spring of 1986, the National Football Foundation and College Football Hall of Fame decided to discontinue their association with the bowl and realign with a new game to be played in Tampa Stadium which would inherit the Hall of Fame Bowl name. Tampa's Hall of Fame Bowl did not initially have any conference tie-ins, so organizers often sought to arrange a match-up between a team from a southern school (usually the Southeastern Conference or Atlantic Coast Conference) and one from another region of the country to maximize both game attendance and potential visitors to the area.

Outback Bowl

Tampa-based restaurant chain Outback Steakhouse became the game's title sponsor in April 1995, allowing the bowl to increase its payout to participants and sign agreements with the  SEC and the Big Ten conferences, creating an annual cross-regional match-up that has continued ever since. In 1999, the bowl moved from Tampa Stadium to newly constructed Raymond James Stadium next door.

ReliaQuest Bowl
Though it had signed a six-year extension in 2019, the parent company of Outback Steakhouse decided to discontinue its association with the game in March 2022 in a cost-cutting measure, ending the longest continuous title sponsorship in college bowl history. In June 2022, Tampa-based cybersecurity company  ReliaQuest was announced as the new title sponsor.

The game

The bowl is played on New Year's Day unless January 1 falls on a Sunday, in which case it is moved to the following Monday. It is usually the first game to start on a day which is traditionally full of college bowl games, and has kicked off as early as 11 a.m. ET. ESPN has had television rights to the game since 1993. Under an extension of those rights signed in 2010, ESPN broadcasts the game on either ABC, ESPN, or ESPN2, in conjunction with the Citrus Bowl and the New Year's Six bowl games. Before 1993, the Hall of Fame Bowl aired on NBC.

Upon signing agreements with the SEC and Big Ten in 1995, the bowl had the third pick of teams from each conference after the Bowl Championship Series (BCS) teams were placed. Since 2014, both the SEC and Big Ten have worked with a group of several bowl games, including this one, to place their bowl-eligible teams after the College Football Playoff (CFP) and associated bowls have made their selections.

As of 2023, the bowl's payout was $6.4 million for each participating team.

Game results

Rankings are based on the AP Poll prior to the game being played.

Source:

MVPs
The bowl has named an MVP since inception; in the inaugural game, there were co-MVPs.

Source:

Most appearances
Updated through the January 2023 edition (37 games, 74 total appearances).

Teams with multiple appearances

Teams with a single appearance
Won (5): Arkansas, Clemson, Michigan State, Minnesota, Ole Miss

Lost (5): Duke, Indiana, Kentucky, NC State, Purdue

Appearances by conference
Updated through the January 2023 edition (37 games, 74 total appearances).

 Games marked with an asterisk (*) were played in January of the following calendar year.
 Results reflect conference affiliations at the time each game was played.
 Big East appearances: Syracuse (1992) and Boston College (1993); the American Athletic Conference (The American) has retained the charter of the original Big East, following its 2013 realignment.
 Independent appearances: Boston College (1986) and Syracuse (1988).

Game records

Source:

Media coverage

The inaugural edition of the bowl was carried by Mizlou in December 1986, with NBC carrying the next five editions (1988–1992). Since 1993, the game has been carried by ESPN or ESPN2, except for four broadcasts on ABC (2011, 2012, 2017, and 2021).

References

External links
 

 
College football bowls in Florida
American football competitions in Tampa, Florida
Recurring sporting events established in 1986
1986 establishments in Florida
New Year's Day